Huayuan Subdistrict is a subdistrict located on southwest side of Nankai District, Tianjin, China. It shares border with New Technology Industrial Park and Wangdingdi Subdistrict to the north, Tiyuzhongxin Subdistrict to the east, as well as Liqizhuang Subdistrict and Jingwu Town to the south. As of 2010, its total population was 52,948.

The subdistrict was established in 1998 as Huayuannan Subdistrict, and renamed to Huayuan Subdistrict a year later. Its name literally translates to "Chinese Garden".

Geography 
Chentaizi Paishui River passes through the western portion of the subdistrict.

Administrative divisions 
So far in 2021, Huayuan Subdistrict consists of 12 residential communities, all of which are listed in the table below:

References 

Township-level divisions of Tianjin
Nankai District, Tianjin